Heather Martin (born November 10, 1963 in Halifax, Nova Scotia) is a Canadian curler from St. John's, Newfoundland and Labrador.

Career

1991–2000
Martin's first Scotties appearance was in 1991, where she was an alternate for Cathy Cunningham. The team would finish 2-9 in round robin play.  She would return to the Scott for four consecutive years, from 1994-1997 playing lead for Laura Phillips. From 1994-1996 the team would not make the playoffs, however, at the 1997 Scott Tournament of Hearts, they would finish round robin play with a 7-4 record advancing as far as the semi final, where they would lose to Ontario's Alison Goring.

2000–2004
She would return to the Scott in 2002, 2003 and 2004, this time playing for lead for Cathy Cunningham. At the 2003 Scott Tournament of Hearts, the team would finish round robin play with a 6-5 record, which was enough to secure 4th place. They would go on to win the 3-4 page play off game, the semi final, but would end up losing the final to Colleen Jones.

2009–2013
Starting in the 2009-2010 season Martin would join forces with Canadian Junior Champion Stacie Devereaux, once again playing lead stones. They would compete in the 2010 Newfoundland and Labrador Scotties Tournament of Hearts finishing round robin with a 4-2 record. They would lose the semifinal to Heather Strong. At the 2011 Newfoundland and Labrador Scotties Tournament of Hearts they would finish round robin undefeated at 5-0, defeating Shelley Nichols in the final.  At the 2011 Scotties Tournament of Hearts the team would finish with a 1-10 round robin record. The team was less successful at the 2012 Newfoundland and Labrador Scotties Tournament of Hearts, losing in the semi-final to the Laura Philips rink. At the 2013 Newfoundland and Labrador Scotties Tournament of Hearts, the team won another provincial title, and went on to represent the province at the 2013 Scotties Tournament of Hearts. The team finished with a 2-9 record there. After the season, Martin retired.

References

External links
 

1963 births
Canadian women curlers
Curlers from Newfoundland and Labrador
Curlers from Nova Scotia
Living people
Sportspeople from Halifax, Nova Scotia
Sportspeople from St. John's, Newfoundland and Labrador
Canada Cup (curling) participants